Kader Arif (born 3 July 1959 in Algiers) is a French politician of the French Socialist Party (PS) who served as Junior Minister for Veterans to the French Minister of Defence Jean-Yves Le Drian from 2012 until 2014. Prior to this, he was a Member of the European Parliament for the south-west of France.

Early career 
 Master's degree in communications
 Special adviser to Lionel Jospin (1988–1992)
 Chargé d'affaires (1992–1995)
 Regional director of a tour operator (1995–1999)
 University manager (1999–2001)

He played as hooker for the French rugby union club Castres Olympique.

Political career

Early beginnings 
 First federal secretary, Haute-Garonne Socialist Party (1999–2008)
 Member of the Socialist Party national bureau (since 2000)
 Socialist Party national secretary, with responsibility for globalisation
 Member of Castanet-Tolosan Municipal Council, with responsibility for sport (1995–2001)

Member of the European Parliament, 2004–2012 
During his time as Member of the European Parliament, Arif served on the Committee on International Trade. He was also a substitute for the Committee on the Environment, Public Health and Food Safety, and a member of the delegations to the EU-Turkey Joint Parliamentary Committee, the ACP-EU Joint Parliamentary Assembly, and the Euro-Mediterranean Parliamentary Assembly.

In January 2012, Arif resigned as the European Parliament's rapporteur of the ACTA agreement in protest to the ACTA agreement.

Junior Minister for Veterans, 2012–2014 
On 16 May 2012, Arif was appointed Junior Minister for Veterans at the French Ministry of Defence in the government of Jean-Marc Ayrault by President François Hollande.

On 21 November 2014, Arif resigned due to suspicion on fraud and opening of judicial inquiry.

See also
 European Parliament election, 2004
 Members of the European Parliament for France 2009–2014

References

External links 

  
 European Parliament biography
 Declaration of financial interests 

1959 births
People from Algiers
Algerian emigrants to France
MEPs for South-West France 2009–2014
Living people
MEPs for South-West France 2004–2009
Socialist Party (France) MEPs